Jeff Rubin (born August 24, 1954) is a Canadian economist and author. He is a former chief economist at CIBC World Markets and is currently a senior fellow at the Centre for International Governance Innovation. 

Rubin had worked at CIBC World Markets and its predecessors since 1988, and served as chief economist from 1992 to 2009, when he resigned.

Education and early career
Rubin completed his B.A. in Economics at the University of Toronto before graduating from McGill University with a Masters in Economics. 
He began working as an economist at the Ontario Government Treasury Department where he was responsible for projecting future interest rates.

Economic forecasts
In 1988, Rubin moved on to the brokerage firm Wood Gundy which was taken over by CIBC and became first CIBC Wood Gundy and then CIBC World Markets. He has accurately predicted fluctuations in interest rates and the value of the Canadian dollar. In the early 1990s he came to prominence projecting a major decline in the Ontario real estate market. He was one of the first economists to accurately predict soaring oil prices in 2000 and is now a popular commentator on oil depletion and its economic repercussions. However, in 2008, when a barrel of oil was $135, Rubin predicted that the price will reach $225 by 2012. This prediction turned out to be wrong with the price of oil crashing in 2009, which -- despite a rebound from 2011-2014 -- stayed relatively low until 2016.

Publications
Rubin writes a blog published every Wednesday for The Globe and Mail newspaper. The blog is also published in the Huffington Post. He is an avid fisherman and frequently uses fishing analogies in his writing.

Rubin wrote the 2009 book Why Your World Is About to Get a Whole Lot Smaller: Oil and the End of Globalization, which won the Canadian Business Book of the Year award. The book was also published with U.S. and U.K editions along with editions in French, Spanish, German, Portuguese, and Italian.  A second Canadian edition was published in 2010. 
Jeff Rubin's second book, The End of Growth - but is that all bad? published by Random House, was released in Canada in a hard cover edition on May 8, 2012. It follows up on the theme of how oil prices are changing the world.  The End of Growth was released in a US edition on October 16, 2012 under the title "The Big Flatline - Oil and the No-Growth Economy".  A third book published by Random House and titled "The Carbon Bubble - What Happens to us When it Bursts" was released in Canada on May 12, 2015. A fourth book published by Random House and titled "The Expendables - How the Middle Class Got Screwed By Globalization" was released in Canada on August 18, 2020.

List of works
 Why Your World Is About to Get a Whole Lot Smaller: Oil and the End of Globalization (2009)
 The End of Growth (2012)
 The Carbon Bubble: What Happens to Us When It Bursts (2015)
 The Expendables: How the Middle Class Got Screwed By Globalization (2020)

External links
 Jeff speaks about global oil consumption, in Seattle on June 8, 2009
 Jeff Rubin Interviewed by Ralph Benmergui on June 18th
 Jeff Rubin on CBC's The Hour
 Jeff Rubin speaks January 2010
 jeff rubin's blog

References

Living people
Canadian economists
1954 births
University of Toronto alumni
Canadian bankers
McGill University alumni
Canadian Imperial Bank of Commerce people